Integral Transforms and Special Functions is a scientific journal, specialised in topics of mathematical analysis, the theory of differential and integral equations, approximation theory, but publishes also papers in other areas of mathematics. It is published monthly by Taylor & Francis.

External links

Mathematics journals
Taylor & Francis academic journals